The following are the national records in speed skating in Norway maintained by the Norges Skøyteforbund (NSF).

Men

Women

References

External links
 NSF web site
 Norwegian Speed Skating records Updated 01.07.2017

National records in speed skating
Records
Speed skating
Speed skating-related lists
Speed skating